Keezhacherry  is a village in the Lattur revenue block of kanchipuram district, Tamil Nadu, India.

Demographics 
As per the 2001 census, Keezhacherry had a total population of  519 with 278 males and 241 females. Out of the total population 323 people were literate.

References

Villages in Pudukkottai district